Hugh Albert O'Donnell, 2nd Earl of Tyrconnell (October 1606 – August/September 1642 ) (originally known in Irish as Aodh Ailbhe mac Rudhraighe Uí Dhomhnaill), was titular King of Tír Conaill, and son of Rory O'Donnell, 1st Earl of Tyrconnell whose title was however attainted in 1614. In adult life, he used the style Earl of Tyrconnell, Baron of Donegal and Lifford, Lord of Sligo and Lower Connaught, and Knight Commander of the Order of Alcántara.

Biography
O'Donnell was the son of Rory O'Donnell, 1st Earl of Tyrconnell and his wife Bridget, the beautiful daughter of Henry FitzGerald, 12th Earl of Kildare.

O'Donnell was three weeks shy of his first birthday when he sailed from Lough Swilly during the Flight of the Earls. He accompanied his father to Rome, where his father and uncle Cathbarr O'Donnell died of fevers. His aunt Rosa,  the wife of Cathbarr, met and married Owen Roe O'Neill, and it is probable that O'Donnell was in her care, because both he and his cousin, also named Hugh O'Donnell, received a modest pension from Archduke Albert, governor of the Low Countries, from 1615, and were raised in Leuven where they were educated by Franciscan colleagues of Archbishop Conry. He was a page to the Infanta Isabella, daughter of King Philip III of Spain. In time he joined the service of King Philip, and was commissioned colonel of a tercio in 1632. He was killed in action when his ship engaged a French vessel in August or September 1642 and caught fire.

O'Donnell left no immediate heirs, although the Earldom, were it not attainted in 1614, would have passed by remainder to his uncle Cathbarr O'Donnell, whose line was extinct by then, and thence, to his 1st cousin Donal Oge O'Donnell, according to the terms of the letters patent.

As Hugh had never recognised James VI and I as his monarch, he had no hope of being recognised as the 2nd Earl, under the principle of the "Fount of honour". He had an undoubted claim to the title, but took no steps in 1614 to defend it when it was debated in the Irish House of Lords. He would at least have had to submit to King James to take his place in the House of Lords, and until then he did so the title was "in abeyance".

Family
O'Donnell married Anna-Margaret, daughter of Maximilien II de Hénin, 5th Count of Bossu, Knight of the Golden Fleece (died 8 December 1625) and  Alexandrine Franeoise de Gavre; and a near kinswoman of the last eccentric Charles, Duke of Guise.

Notes

References

 

 "Hugh O'Donnell, 2nd Earl of Tyrconnell (1606-1642) Prince and Lord of Tryconnell.

Further reading
 — in passing

1606 births
1642 deaths
Flight of the Earls
Kings of Tír Chonaill
Earls of Tyrconnell
Irish chiefs of the name